The fifth and final series of the British television sitcom Absolutely Fabulous premiered on BBC One on 17 October 2003 and concluded on 24 December 2003, consisting of eight episodes. A Christmas special, "White Box", followed the fifth series and was broadcast in 2004. Though no further series have followed, three specials were broadcast several years later to mark the show's 20th anniversary for 2012.

Cast and characters

Main
 Jennifer Saunders as Edina Monsoon
 Joanna Lumley as Patsy Stone 
 Julia Sawalha as Saffron Monsoon 
 Jane Horrocks as Bubble / Katy Grin
 June Whitfield as Mother

Recurring
 Helen Lederer as Catriona
 Harriet Thorpe as Fleur
 Fern Britton as herself
 Emma Bunton as herself
 Felix Dexter as John
 Naoko Mori as Sarah
 Mo Gaffney as Bo
 Chris Ryan as Marshall
 Christopher Malcolm as Justin
 Simon Brodkin as doctor

Guest

 Llewella Gideon as tanning beautician
 Janette Krankie as midwife
 Kristin Scott Thomas as Plum
 Mariella Frostrup as herself
 Minnie Driver as herself
 Mossie Smith as Flossie
 Stephen Finegold as policeman
 Emer O'Connor as policewoman
 Clarissa Dickson Wright as herself
 Sergio Priftis as Chicago dancer
 Todd Talbot as Chicago dancer
 Simon Breen as Chicago dancer
 Zak Nemorin as Chicago dancer
 Richard Roe as Chicago dancer
 Robert Lindsay as Pete
 Katie Blake as Booberella actor
 Sam Spedding as Booberella actor
 Elton John as himself
 Charlotte Palmer as zoo keeper
 Perou as photographer
 Jean Paul Gaultier as himself
 Alex Lowe as wood cutter
 Eleanor Bron as Patsy's mother
 Kate O'Mara as Jackie
 Amy Phillips as paramedic
 Marion Pashley as nurse

"White Box" guest cast

 Nathan Lane as Kunz
 Laurie Metcalf as Crystalline
 Miranda Richardson as Bettina
 Patrick Barlow as Max
 Mo Gaffney as Bo
 Christopher Ryan as Marshall
 Miranda Hart as Yoko
 Terence Conran as himself

Episodes

Award and nominations
Series 5

Television and Radio Industries Club Awards

—Won: TRIC Award for Best TV Comedy Programme

White Box

BAFTA Awards

—Nominated: BAFTA Award for Best Make Up & Hair Design – Christine Cant

Home media
DVD (Region 1)
 "Series 5" – 13 September 2005
 As part of "Absolutely Fabulous: Absolutely Everything" (9-disc set) – 27 May 2008
 As Part of the "Absolutely Fabulous: Absolutely All of It!" (10-disc set) - 5 November 2013

DVD (Region 2)
 "Series 5" – 27 September 2004
 As part of "Absolutely Fabulous: Absolutely Everything" (10-disc set) – 15 November 2010
 As part of "Absolutely Fabulous: Absolutely Everything - The Definitive Edition" (11-disc set) – 17 March 2014

DVD (Region 4)
 "Series 5" – 8 April 2004
 As part of "Absolutely Fabulous: Absolutely Everything"  (9-disc set) – 20 April 2006
 As part of "Absolutely Fabulous: Complete Collection" (10-disc set) – 5 April 2011
 As Part of the "Absolutely Everything: Definitive Edition" (11-disc set) – 30 April 2014

'White Box special
 United States
 "White Box" – 16 October 2007
 As part of "Absolutely Fabulous: Absolutely Everything" (9-disc set) – 27 May 2008
 As Part of the "Absolutely Fabulous: Absolutely All of It!" (10-disc set) - 5 November 2013
 United Kingdom
 As part of "Absolutely Fabulous: Absolutely Everything" (10-disc set) – 15 November 2010
 As part of "Absolutely Fabulous: Absolutely Everything - The Definitive Edition" (11-disc set) – 17 March 2014

Note: "White Box" has never been released in the UK as an individual DVD, but was first released as part of the "Absolutely Everything" collection in 2010

 Australia
 "White Box" – 2 November 2005
 As part of "Absolutely Fabulous: Absolutely Everything"  (9-disc set) – 20 April 2006
 As part of "Absolutely Fabulous: Complete Collection" (10-disc set) – 5 April 2011
 As Part of the "Absolutely Everything: Definitive Edition" (11-disc set) – 30 April 2014

Other media
A behind-the-scenes special documentary, "The Story Of Absolutely Fabulous", was broadcast on 2 January 2004. The special gives a definitive account of the history of the series.

A Comic Relief special sketch of Absolutely Fabulous was broadcast on 11 March 2005. The story follows Edina and Patsy as they reluctantly accompany Emma Bunton to the taping of Comic Relief at the BBC Television Centre. Inside, a member of the production staff can't find Emma's name on the list of presenters, prompting Edina to suggest they check again under Queen Noor or Lulu. Emma and Edina bicker in a dressing room when Edina insists that the point of Emma's participation should be to gain greater exposure for herself. Edina urges Emma to lobby director and Comic Relief founder Richard Curtis for a role in one of his films. When Richard visits the dressing room to apologise for Emma having been left off the list, Edina and Patsy fail to recognise him and ask him to fetch Richard straightaway. Emma angrily writes a cheque to the charity and storms off. When the production staffer returns to collect Emma (now scheduled to appear after Graham Norton), Edina and Patsy first conceal (in the dressing room) and then loudly acknowledge (on-stage, live, during the Comic Relief special) Emma's departure. Patsy is struck by stage fright while Edina attempts a song. Once Patsy wets herself, both are quickly shooed from the stage by a horrified Graham. Miranda Hart also appears in the sketch as a production staffer.

Future episodes

Following the fifth series and the "White Box" special, no further series were produced. However, in 2011, Saunders wrote three specials that were broadcast to commemorate Absolutely Fabulous 20th anniversary. The three specials"—"Identity", "Job" and "Olympics"—were broadcast in late 2011 and early-to-mid-2012.

Notes

References

External links
 Absolutely Fabulous series 5 – list of episodes on IMDb

2003 British television seasons
Series 5